Miguel Pedraza (born 23 March 1969) is a Puerto Rican archer. He competed in the men's individual event at the 1988 Summer Olympics.

References

1969 births
Living people
Puerto Rican male archers
Olympic archers of Puerto Rico
Archers at the 1988 Summer Olympics
Place of birth missing (living people)
20th-century Puerto Rican people